This is a list of notable universities in Angola.

Public
 Agostinho Neto University,  Talatona
 Cuito Cuanavale University, Menongue
 José Eduardo dos Santos University, Huambo
 Katyavala Bwila University, Benguela
 Kimpa Vita University, Uíge
 Lueji A'Nkonde University, Dundo
 Mandume ya Ndemufayo University, Lubango
 University of Namibe, Moçâmedes
 University of Luanda, Luanda
 11 de Novembro University, Cabinda
 Rainha Njinga a Mbandi University, Malanje

Private
 Universidade Católica de Angola, Luanda
 Universidade Jean Piaget de Angola, Portuguese university based in Luanda and Benguela
 Universidade Lusíada, Portuguese-backed university with campuses in Luanda, Benguela and Cabinda

References

 
Universities
Angola
Angola